"Runaway" is the fourth single released from iiO's debut album, Poetica.

Track Listing and Formats

Maxi CD 1

Maxi CD 2

Charts

References

External links
 Runaway at Discogs

2004 singles
IiO songs
Songs written by Nadia Ali (singer)
2004 songs